Barka is a coastal city and province in the region Al Bāţinah, in northern Oman. Bordered by the Sea of Oman and the Al Hajar mountains in southern Batinah, Barka is about a half-hour drive from Seeb and roughly an hours drive from Al Khuwair and Ruwi.

History
Al Bloushi, Al-Farsi, Al Zadjali, Al Habsi, Al Ajmi, Al Owaisi, Al Amri, Al Badri, Al Raisi tribes live here. The area is known for its agricultural beauty, fishing, and traditional pastimes like horse and camel racing, halwa making, and Omani-style bullfighting.

Attractions

Nearby is Bait Na'aman (Nu'man), a four-towered fort of the 17th-century iman Bil'arab bin Sultan, renovated in 1991. Barka Fort is a known tourist spot. Barka Souq, near to the beach is an economically important area. 

There are two major resorts in Barka, the Al-Sawadi resort and the Al-Nahda resort.

Economy

A new quarter is now under construction in Barka, called "Blue City", located in Sawadi.  The development is 8 km from Sawadi beach, and many international companies are involved in Barka development projects.  There is an estimated $15 billion in new construction currently taking place in Barka. 

Barka is the site of several power and water plants including:
 The Barka 2 water and power plant, with generation capacity of 678 MW and desalination capacity of 26.4 million gallons of potable water per day.
 The Barka 3 gas turbine power plant, with generation capacity of 744 MW, sponsored by Engie, Yonden and Sojitz.
 A new 281,000 m³/d desalination plant is to be commissioned: Itochu, Degremont and International Power were named preferred bidders in 2015.

References

Further reading
 Westermann, Großer Atlas zur Weltgeschichte 

 
Populated places in Oman
Populated coastal places in Oman